is a former singer, tarento and English teacher in Japan. She is a hāfu American who started her music career under the name "Patty Fink" in 1979.

Bio
Patricia Ann Fink was born on November 5, 1960 in Iruma, Saitama, to a Japanese mother, Hiroko Takahashi and an American father, an airman. She attended Kubasaki and Kadena High School in Okinawa and Yokota High School in Tokyo. In 1979, she made her recording debut with her first single "My Life", a soundtrack song of the movie "See How She Runs" (Japanese title: My Life) on the Seven Seas label (King Records) as Patty Fink. As Patty, she signed with Eastworld record label (Toshiba EMI) and released her second single, "Taiyo no Utopia" on February 5, 1980. This NTV drama theme music song peaked at No. 18 on the Oricon chart. In the same year, she sang other channel 4 drama's title songs "Konoyume no Hatemade" (Oricon #27) and "Ashita...Saku" (Oricon #29). Without English lyrics, "Ashita" is best remembered among Japanese people. She released three vinyl albums, "My Life" (1978), "Far Away" (1980), "Second Impression" (1981) and one compact disc, "Idol Miracle Bible Patty Best" (2003), reissue of her EMI albums and a single. As she is fluent in both Japanese and English, she appeared on television and radio shows a lot. She also posed in bikinis for Weekly Playboy magazine three times and the cover of Heibon Punch magazine. She now lives with two chihuahuas in Tampa, Florida.

Music

Songs
My Life (written by Jimmie Haskell)
Taiyo no Utopia
Konoyume no Hatemade / Yesterday Is Gone
Kimagure ni Sayonara / Wind
Ashita...Saku
Létranger
Blue My Love
Ai no Country Song
Ai no Coffee Break
Omoide no Pendant (Kisetsu no Mayoigo)
Cisco yori Ai wo Komete / You Never Made Me Feel Bad
A Traveller in New Orleans
Lovers in Paris 
The Land of the Midnight Sun
Jiyu heno Kokai / Far Away
Amor
Summer Love Affair
Squall Love
Pearl Islands 
Nagisa no Omoide
Yumeiro Heart
Toki no Mayoigo

Albums
My Life (Original Soundtrack, last name misspelled as "Finck")
Far Away
Second Impression
Idol Miracle Bible Patty Best

Television
Bikkuri Nihon Shinkiroku
Kakkurakin Daihoso!!
Let's Go Young
8jidayo! Zenin Shugo (DVD release)
Kohaku Utano Best Ten
Yanyan Utau Studio

Radio
Hyakumannin no Eigo (English for Millions)
American English Dojo with Hyde YanoThis program was very popular among English learners.American English Dojo Audio 
Yoru ha Tomodachi Koasa no Happy Talk
Akashiya Sanma no All Night Nippon

Magazines
Weekly Playboy
Heibon Punch

Trivia
One of her favorite memories was interviewing Styx for a concert at the age of 22. She was starstruck and could barely talk.
She went to Japan with Diana Ross for her Amway Tokyo Dome concert as her manager in 1994.

References

External links
 Patricia Fink Facebook

1960 births
Living people
Japanese women singers
Japanese television personalities
Musicians from Saitama Prefecture
Japanese idols
American women musicians of Japanese descent
American musicians of Japanese descent
21st-century American women